1993 Empress's Cup Final was the 15th final of the Empress's Cup competition. The final was played at Nishigaoka Soccer Stadium in Tokyo on March 27, 1994. Yomiuri Nippon SC Beleza won the championship.

Overview
Yomiuri Nippon SC Beleza won their 3rd title, by defeating Prima Ham FC Kunoichi 2–0.

Match details

See also
1993 Empress's Cup

References

Empress's Cup
1993 in Japanese women's football